Take It from Me may refer to:

Take It from Me (1937 film), a 1937 British comedy film
Take It from Me (1926 film), a film by William A. Seiter
Take It from Me (album), a 1964 album by Terry Gibbs
"Take It from Me" (Commodores song) (1987)
"Take It from Me" (Girlfriend song) (1992)
"Take It from Me" (Paul Brandt song) (1997)
"Take It from Me" (Jordan Davis song) (2018)
"Take It from Me", a 1983 song by Platinum Blonde from Standing in the Dark
"Take It from Me", a 2016 song by Kongos from Egomaniac
Take It from Me, a 1953–54 television series starring Jean Carroll